Canal Panda was a Spanish pay television channel, which was one of the first country's subscription network dedicated to children's programming, mostly animated series.

History 

Canal Panda was the first Portuguese and Spanish channel exclusively dedicated to children and teens. Its daily broadcast was 20 hours a day, without interruptions, and with a big variety of programs such as cartoons, anime, live-action series, children's films and special programs about sports, music and culture.

It was founded on 1 April 1996 with the name Panda Club in Portugal, it changed to Canal Panda a year later. The channel launched in Spain on 15 September 1997 for the launch of Via Digital.

Initially it was distributed in Spain, but on 1 January 2001, satellite provider Vía Digital stopped carrying the channel, justifying the strong competition in the Spanish market and was replaced by Megatrix, with distribution deal with Antena 3. In 2004, Megatrix closed down due to the merger between satellite providers Canal Satélite Digital and Vía Digital.

On 1 April 2011, Canal Panda was relaunched in Spain due to a decision of Chello Multicanal for recovering the brand and replacing KidsCo which Chello was the Spanish distributor and was not satisfied with the bill. Since then, it is considered an Iberian channel. The focus of programming on the channel also shifted towards preschool shows. The launch was met with some controversy among the otaku community, as its Portuguese counterpart was showing some animes, but the Spanish version claimed that such titles didn't match the channel's content criteria.

On 6 July 2015, the channel changed its look and logo.

On 2 July 2019, Vodafone TV added the channel in HD to its pack offer.

On 1 June 2021, the channel launched a block aimed at older children and teenage audiences called Panda Kids which airs live-action shows, game shows and reality shows. In Portugal, Panda Kids is a pop-up channel.

On 15 December 2022, the channel closed down again. The physical channel got replaced with Enfamilia, with the Canal Panda branding continuing as a two-hour block called Panda Enfamilia.

Programs (1997-2000)

 Doraemon
 Don Quijote de La Mancha
 El conde Duckula
 Billy el gato
 La orquesta de Óscar
 Los pingüinos revoltosos
 Las aventuras de Whisbone
 Cuentos clásicos
 Historias de mi infancia
 Historias de la cripta
 C.L.Y.D.E.
 Las aventuras de Blinky Bill
 Dino Babies
 Las Tortugas Ninja
 Garfield y sus amigos
 El perro Dinky
 Crocadoo
 Las nuevas aventuras de Robin Hood
 Sharky y George
 Historias del fútbol
 Mr. Bogus
 Locos de atar
 El loco mundo de Robby y Laly
 La isla de Noah
 Ciudad bebé
 Profunda oscuridad
 Los chicos del mañana
 Bobobobs
 Aventuras en la isla
 El retorno de D'Artacan
 ¿Dónde está Wally?
 Robinson Sucroe
 Max y Molly
 Rayito, el mago de los deseos
 Fiebre de fútbol
 Casper, el fantasma bueno
 Los cuentos de Papá Castor
 Banana Zoo
 Disputas
 Calamity Jane
 El grupo increíble
 Widget
 Gatobasura, el rey de los trastos
 La pequeña Rosey
 La piedra de los sueños
 Rocky y los dodos
 Cadillacs y dinosaurios
 Las fantásticas aventuras de Sooty
 The Treacle People
 Las leyendas de la isla del tesoro
 La pandilla de Ovideo
 Los navegantes
 Salvemos el anfiteatro
 ReBoot
 Las mil y una... Américas
 Meteoro
 El nuevo mundo de los gnomos
 Los osos voladores
 Los chicos de Hillshade
 La princesa Starla
 Reporteros con clase
 Percy, el guardabosques
 Sandokán
 ¡Hola, Spencer!
 Gente común
 Lobos, brujas y gigantes

References 

AMC Networks International
Children's television networks
Defunct television channels in Spain
Television stations in Spain
Spanish-language television stations
Television channels and stations established in 1996

es:Canal Panda